Modderfontein Commando was a light infantry regiment of the South African Army. It formed part of the South African Army Infantry Formation as well as the South African Territorial Reserve.

History

Origin
Modderfontein Commando was tasked with the protection of the countries biggest manufacturer of explosives.

Operations

With the SADF
The Modderfontein Dynamite Factory in 1969.
Before that era the factory was protected by a unit of the National Volunteer Battalion that was made up of "keymen" and other volunteers.
In 1946 the NVB units were stood down.

The commando was formed as an urban commando and then converted in early 1980 into an industrial commando with the task of protecting the complex at Modderfontein. Manpower for the commando was largely drawn from men working for AECI who had a military commitment.

The Commando was structured into a headquarters with four companies.

With the SANDF

Disbandment
This unit, along with all other Commando units was disbanded after a decision by South African President Thabo Mbeki to disband all Commando Units. The Commando system was phased out between 2003 and 2008 "because of the role it played in the apartheid era", according to the Minister of Safety and Security Charles Nqakula.

Unit Insignia

Leadership

References

See also 
 South African Commando System

Infantry regiments of South Africa
South African Commando Units
Disbanded military units and formations in Johannesburg